Microdrillia sansibarica is a species of sea snail, a marine gastropod mollusk in the family Borsoniidae.

According to Kilburn this species may be a synonym of Microdrillia patricia, but appears to have a more produced base and to lack a basal cord on early whorls.

According to Tucker (2004), Bela (Acrobela) sansibarica Thiele, J., 1925 is a synonym of Bela chuni Thiele, 1925.

Description

Distribution
This marine species occurs in the Zanzibar Channel.

References

 Thiele, J. 1925. Gastropoda der Deutschen Tiefsee-Expedition, 1898–1899. II Wiss. Ergebn. dt. Tiefsee Exped. 'Valdivia' 17(2) 36–382.

External links
  Gastropods.com: Microdrillia sansibarica
  Bouchet P., Kantor Yu.I., Sysoev A. & Puillandre N. (2011) A new operational classification of the Conoidea. Journal of Molluscan Studies 77: 273–308

sansibarica
Gastropods described in 1925